British – Serbian relations are foreign relations between the United Kingdom and Serbia. Both countries established diplomatic relations in 1837. The UK has an embassy and consulate in Belgrade and Serbia has an embassy in London. The Serbian ambassador to the United Kingdom is Dr Dejan Popovic and the British ambassador to Serbia is Sian MacLeod.

Trade between the two countries in 2004 amounted to US$245.8 million. In the first ten months of 2005 exports of Serbia and Montenegro to Great Britain accounted for US$68.2 million (110.6 per cent increase compared to the same period in 2004) and the imports from the UK were US$104.2 million (85 per cent increase compared to the same period in 2004).

The 2001 UK Census recorded 31,244 people born in the former state of Serbia and Montenegro, which are now the independent states of Serbia and Montenegro, while Kosovo's independence from Serbia is still disputed.

History

The Kingdom of Serbia and the UK were allies in World War I. British influence in Serbia became more relevant only after WWI. Around 350 Serb pupils and students received an education in the United Kingdom during this period and afterwards, under the supervision of university professor Pavle Popović, who was a visiting professor at King's College. The Serbian Relief Fund and Serbian Minister's Fund were formed for the purpose of providing financial and other aid to Serb students in UK, and a hostel for Serb students was opened. In the 1920s, Serbs went to Britain to study banking, finances and economics, while in the 1930s mining engineering was the main field of study.

In the Kingdom of Yugoslavia, the UK was perceived as a friendly country and an ally. Serb elites, based mostly in Belgrade, like Slobodan Jovanovic and Bogdan Bogdanovic considered that Serbs and the British shared a joint love of liberty and fierce patriotism, and they advocated looking upon United Kingdom in order to further develop democracy in the country.

As early as the 1920s, London made its way to Serbia, mostly through banks. In 1920, the  British Trade Corporation was founded in Belgrade. Although this bank only operated until 1928, its work led to serious improvements in the local industry, primarily mining. In the same period, relations between the Serbian Orthodox Church and the Church of England were established. Several big donations of books by British to Serbian libraries took place in the 1920s. British citizens were the main foreign sponsors of scientific research in the interwar period. Archaeological excavations in Vinča were funded by sir Charles Hyde.

Bishop Nikolaj Velimirović played an important role in furthering the relations between the two countries. He was held in high regard in London, and Velimirović was the first Orthodox clergyman to preach at St. Paul’s Cathedral. He established firm relations between the Serbian Orthodox Church with the Church of England.

An English Language and Literature Department was formed in Belgrade in 1929. Cultural and other exchanges became popular in the interwar period. A number of societies of Yugoslav-British friendship were functioning in Belgrade in 1930s, with full support from the Yugoslav government. Several important local cultural figures were part of the friendship society, such as Isidora Sekulić, Raša Plaović, and Viktor Novak. As of 1935, the English language was taught in schools in Serbia, but to a smaller degree compared to French and German, due to lack of teachers and political reasons. A total of 75 students with Yugoslav citizenship were enrolled at British faculties in the Interwar period, of which six got their PhD in the country, mostly in the subject of English literature.

Following the Yugoslav coup d'état, the Kingdom of Yugoslavia entered World War II on the Allied side.

See also
 Foreign relations of the United Kingdom
 Foreign relations of Serbia
 Serbs in the United Kingdom
 Britons in Serbia
 United Kingdom–Yugoslavia relations

Notes

References

Further reading
 Antić, Čedomir D. "Crisis and Armament: Economic Relations Between Great Britain and Serbia 1910–1912." Balcanica 36 (2005): 151-163 online.
 Bataković, Dušan T. "Serbia and Greece in the First World War: an overview." Balkan Studies 45.1 (2004): 59-80 online.
 Antić, Čedomir. Ralph Paget: a diplomat in Serbia (Institute for Balkan Studies, Serbian Academy of Sciences and Arts, 2006) online free.
 Boyd, James. "Representing the Western Balkans, Post-war Understandings: A discourse analysis of contemporary representations of Bosnia, Serbia and Croatia in UK press media." (2018) online.
  
 Gavrilović, Michael. "The Early Diplomatic Relations of Great Britain and Serbia." Slavonic Review (1922):  1#1 86-109 online.
 Gavrilović, Michael. "The Early Diplomatic Relations of Great Britain and Serbia.(II)." Slavonic Review (1922): 333-351 online.
 Gavrilović, Michael. "The Early Diplomatic Relations of Great Britain and Serbia.(III)." Slavonic Review (1923): 552-560 online.
 Glaurdić, Josip. The hour of Europe: Western powers and the breakup of Yugoslavia (Yale UP, 2011).
 Hodge, Carole. Britain and the Balkans: 1991 until the Present (Routledge, 2006).
 McCourt, David. "Embracing humanitarian intervention: Atlanticism and the UK interventions in Bosnia and Kosovo." British Journal of Politics and International Relations 15.2 (2013): 246-262 online.
 Markovich, Slobodan G., ed. British-Serbian Relations from the 18th to the 21st Centuries (Faculty of Political Science of the University of Belgrade [and] Zepter Book World, 2018) online link.
 Pavlowitch, Stevan K. Anglo-Russian rivalry in Serbia 1837-1839 (1961)
 Simms, Brendan. Unfinest hour: Britain and the destruction of Bosnia (Penguin UK, 2002).

External links

 British Foreign and Commonwealth Office about relations with Serbia
 British embassy in Belgrade
 Serbian Ministry of Foreign Affairs about relations with the United Kingdom
 Serbian embassy in London

 
Bilateral relations of the United Kingdom 
United Kingdom
1837 establishments in Europe